Cinnaholic is an American cinnamon roll bakery franchise founded in 2010 in Berkeley, California. The company is known for its made-to-order, gourmet vegan cinnamon rolls and other sweet treats. As of August 2022, Cinnaholic operates 73 bakeries across the United States and Canada. 

All of Cinnaholic's products are 100 percent vegan, dairy & lactose-free, egg-free and cholesterol-free. In addition to cinnamon rolls, Cinnaholic serves scratch-made brownies, raw chocolate chip cookie dough, baked chocolate chip cookies, cinnamon roll cakes and bite-sized cinnamon rolls called 'Baby Buns.'

The company's co-founders, Shannon and Florian Radke, appeared on the television show Shark Tank in 2014, which ended with the pair initially accepting an offer from Robert Herjavec and then later declining the offer.

Cinnaholic is headquartered in Atlanta, Georgia.

History 

Shannon and Florian Radke opened the first Cinnaholic bakery on Oxford Street in Berkeley, California in July 2010. The husband and wife team appeared on the television show Shark Tank in 2014, which ended in an investment offer. The company adopted a franchise business model in 2015.

Cinnaholic Franchising, LLC. moved its headquarters from Berkeley, California to Atlanta, Georgia. Cinnaholic's first franchise-operated bakeshop opened in Southlake, Texas near Dallas in October 2015. The company opened its first international bakery in Edmonton, Alberta, Canada May 2018. 

Cinnaholic was named to Entrepreneur Magazine’s “Top New Franchisees of 2018” list. Co-founder, Shannon Radke, appeared on the cover of the September 2018 issue of Franchise Times Magazine. The couple were also featured in Diablo Magazine's “40 under 40” issue in January 2014.

See also 
 List of franchises
 List of bakeries
 List of vegetarian restaurants
 Veganism

References

5. https://www.firstcoastnews.com/article/life/food/first-coast-foodies/shark-tank-cinnamon-roll-bakery-closes-shop-in-mandarin-less-than-a-year-after-opening/77-0b0b2bd4-faf0-4c9b-bb70-5560563eb0b1

External links
Official website

Fast-food chains of the United States
Restaurants established in 2010
Vegan restaurants in the United States
2010 establishments in California
Companies based in Atlanta